The 752nd Special Operations Group (752 SOG) is an operational unit of the United States Air Force Special Operations Command. A subordinate unit of the 352nd Special Operations Wing, it is stationed at RAF Mildenhall, Suffolk, England, UK.

As part of the 352nd SOW, the 752nd SOG is the United States Air Force special operations forces contribution to the U.S. Special Operations Command, Europe (SOCEUR), a subcommand of the United States European Command.

Mission
The 752nd Special Operations Group is responsible for planning and executing specialized and contingency operations using CV-22 Osprey & MC-130J Commando II aircraft, tactics and air refueling techniques to infiltrate, exfiltrate and resupply special operations forces.

Units
The 752nd Special Operations Group consists of the following squadrons:

 7th Special Operations Squadron (CV-22 Osprey)
 67th Special Operations Squadron (MC-130J Commando II)
 321st Special Tactics Squadron (Pararescue, Combat Controller, SOWT)
 352nd Special Operations Support Squadron

References

752